Qixia Temple is a Buddhist temple located on Qixia Mountain in the suburban Qixia District of Nanjing, Jiangsu,  northeast of downtown Nanjing. It is one of Nanjing's most important Buddhist monasteries. The temple is the cradle of East Asian Mādhyamaka.

History 
Built in AD 489, the 7th year of the Yongming era during the Southern Qi dynasty (479–502), the temple is known for its large collection of Chinese Buddhist visual art and sculptural art in the grounds. These consist of pagodas, murals and artwork that date back to the 10th century.  

It has had several names over the centuries, including the "Gongde Temple" (Tang dynasty), "Miaoyin Temple" (Southern Tang dynasty), "Puyun Temple" (Song dynasty), "Yanyin Chongbao Chan Temple" (Song dynasty), "Jingde Qixia Temple" (Song dynasty) and "Huxue Temple" (Song dynasty). 

In 1372, at the dawn of Ming dynasty (1368–1644), the temple was renamed "Qixia Temple" which is still in use now. 

In the late Qing dynasty (1644–1911), Qixia Temple was completely destroyed by the Taiping Rebellion. 

The modern restoration of the entire temple complex was carried out in 1919, after the establishment of the Republic of China. During the Nanjing Massacre, the temple was a temporary refuge of four months for more than 24,000 civilians fleeing the masscare. The incident was reenacted into a movie Qixia Temple 1937, which helped in boosting visitorship to the temple. 

Near the temple site and situated on the slopes of Qixia Hill, is the "Thousand Buddha Caves", a grotto containing many Buddhist sculptural works of art.

Description

Buddha's Relics Pagoda
The Qixia Stupa or Buddha's Relics Pagoda is in the southeast of Qixia Temple. It was built in 601 and destroyed in the Tang dynasty (618–907). In 945, it was rebuilt by Southern Tang dynasty emperor Li Jing. 

The pagoda has a five-story, octagon-shaped structure.

Pilu Hall
Behind the Mahavira Hall is the Pilu Hall enshrining the statues of Vairocana, Brahma and Indra. At the back of Vairocana's statue are statues of Guanyin, Longnü and Sudhana. The statues of the Twenty Devas stand on both sides of the hall.

Pavilion of Giant Buddha
The statue of Amitābha is enshrined in the Pavilion of Giant Buddha. It was built in the 5th century during the Southern Qi dynasty (479–502). Statues of Guanyin and Mahasthamaprapta stand on the left and right sides of Amitābha's statue.

Thousand Buddha Rock
To east side of the Qixia Stupa is the Thousand Buddha Rock, the only Buddhist grottoes of the Southern dynasties (420–589) in China. There are 297 Buddhist niches and 515 statues. In the following dynasties, such as Tang (618–907), Song (960–1279), Yuan (1271–1368) and Ming dynasties (1368–1644), statues were also carved. Totally there are more than 700 statues.

Alumni

Hsing Yun
Hsing Yun, the founder of Taiwan's Fo Guang Shan, is Qixia Temple’s most notable alumnus in the contemporary period. He was tonsured at Qixia Temple in 1941. He was a disciple of Master Zhikai and studied for several years at the Qixia Vinaya School.

References

Bibliography

 

Religious buildings and structures in Nanjing
Tourist attractions in Nanjing
1919 establishments in China
20th-century Buddhist temples
Religious buildings and structures completed in 1919
Buddhist temples in Nanjing
Major National Historical and Cultural Sites in Jiangsu
Buddhist relics